The United States Navy built permanent and temporary submarine bases around the world to maintain its fleet of submarines and serve the needs of the crews. Submarine bases are military bases that offer good fleet anchorage and are designed to refuel and resupply submarines. The peak number of US submarine bases was during World War II, as the submarine was well suited for fighting in the vast Pacific War, often in enemy waters. Many of the United States submarine bases were closed after the war.

History
The need for US submarine bases was created with the completion of the first submarine  launched in May 1897. The USS Holland was acquired by the Navy 11 April 1900. On 16 October 1900, the USS Holland departed for her first port, United States Naval Academy at Annapolis, Maryland for crew training. USS Holland had a crew of one officer, and five enlisted men. Annapolis being a training center was not designated a submarine base, though the USS Holland was stationed there. 

The USS Pike and the USS Grampus completed in 1902 were built in San Francisco, California. The Holland Torpedo Boat Company of New York City contracted Union Iron Works to build the two Plunger-class submarines. For three and half years the two submarines operated out of Mare Island Naval Shipyard in San Francisco Bay for training and testing. Mare Island, being a shipyard, also was not designated a submarine base.

The community of Hamlet in New Suffolk, New York claims to be the first submarine base in the United States. The USS Holland was based at Hamlet's Holland Torpedo Boat Station, open from 1899 to 1905. Seven submarines built by the Holland Torpedo Boat Company were stationed at Hamlet. Torpedo Boat Station, also was not designated a submarine base by the US Navy, being a private company with Navy personnel stationed there.

By January 1911 the Navy had 20 submarines built: Seven A-class submarine, Three B-class submarine, five C-class submarine, three D-class submarine, and two E-class submarines.

United States F-class submarine were built by the Electric Boat in 1909. The first two,  and * were built by Union Iron Works. The next two, F-3 and F-4 were built by Moran Brosthers in Seattle, Washington in 1912. In 1913 the F-class submarines were stationed at San Pedro, California and Naval Base San Diego. San Pedro and San Diego also were not designated submarine bases. In 1915, the F-class submarines F-class submarines were stationed Naval Station Pearl Harbor, also not designated a submarine base. In 1917 F-class submarines were stationed at San Diego and San Diego's Point Loma. 

The United States Navy designated Naval Submarine Base New London as the first submarine base. Naval Submarine Base New London was commissioned in 1916 as a dedicated submarine base.

Due to the Japanese hostilities in China and the South Pacific in 1939 the US Congress approved plans for building submarine bases and seaplane bases at Dutch Harbor Alaska, Kodiak, Alaska, Midway Atoll, and Wake Island.

The ship USS Wyoming (BM-10) built in 1902 was used as the first submarine tender. The USS Wyoming and other Arkansas-class monitors were converted into submarine tenders, as they had low sides, good for mooring a submarine on her side.  The submarine tender refueled and resupplied the submarines. The submarine tender allowed the submarine to operate at its patrol area long, operating out of advanced bases in the field. This reduced the need to return to permanent bases farther away. Other early Submarine Tenders, Auxiliary Submarine ship, known as "AS", were USS Alert (AS-4), USS Camden (AS-6) US Rainbow (AS-7) and USS Canopus (AS-9). The USS Beaver was the first specially built submarine tender, completed in 1918. Other submarine tenders were built by conversions. The demand for submarine bases during World War 2 was so great that many specially built submarine tenders were built. Submarine Tender carried fuel for the submarines, food for the crew, and living quarters for the crew to rest while the sub was being serviced. The ship's depot would have all the supplies that the submarine needed to get back on patrol. Submarine bases that had limited or no land facilities used submarine Tender at the advanced submarine bases. The USS Fulton, commissioned on 7 December 1914, was the first of the Fulton-class submarine tenders. Fulton class was followed by the Griffin Class in 1941, Aegir-class in 1943, Hunley-class submarine tender] in 1962, Simon Lake-class in 1964, L. Y. Spear-class in 1970, Emory S. Land-class in 1974, Emory S. Land Class in 1979. 

The current US Navy fleet of nuclear submarines never need to be refueled. Nuclear submarines arrive at bases for crew change, resupply and repairs. Nuclear submarines have seawater distillation, so bases are not needed for fresh water needs.

Active Bases
United States Navy submarine bases:
 Naval Station Pearl Harbor, Hawaii (1917– ) - Naval Submarine Base Pearl Harbor
 Naval Base Guam (1944– )
 Submarine Base Kings Bay at Camden County, Georgia (2014– )
 Naval Base Kitsap at Kitsap Peninsula Washington (2004–)
 Submarine Base New London at Groton, Connecticut (1916– )
 Naval Station Norfolk at Norfolk, Virginia (1917– )
 Naval Base Point Loma San Diego, California (1917– )
 Naval Support Activity Bahrain, Manama, Bahrain (2014– ), forward base.
 Naval Support Activity Naples (1951– ) Submarine Group 8 with Sixth Fleet, forward base.

Active Centers
 Submarine School at Submarine Base New London, for Basic Enlisted Submarine School
 Naval Submarine Medical Research Laboratory at New London Submarine Base
 Naval Undersea Warfare Center at Newport, Rhode Island
 Portsmouth Naval Shipyard repair shipyard at Portsmouth, New Hampshire
Naval Magazine Indian Island, refitted Ohio class missile submarines

Closed bases
Closed United States Navy submarine bases:
San Pedro Submarine Base (1917–1923) San Pedro, California
Naval Air Station Key West (1917–1919), (1942–1945)
Fremantle submarine base (1942–1945) at Naval Base Perth
Auxiliary Albany Submarine Base (1942–1944) at Albany, Western Australia
Brisbane Submarine base at (1942–1945) Naval Base Brisbane
Naval Base Darwin (1942–1945)
Cavite Submarine Base (1919-1960s) at Naval Base Cavite, Philippine
Iliuliuk Submarine Base at Dutch Harbor Naval Operating Base (1941–1945) in Alaska
Kodiak Naval Operating Base at Womens Bay, Alaska, now Coast Guard Base Kodiak in Alaska
Wake Submarine Base on Wake Island (11 December 1941– )
Submarine Base Midway at Naval Air Facility Midway Island
Yokosuka Submarine Base (1945–?) at Naval Base Yokosuka, Japan
Majuro Submarine Base (1944–1945)
Ulithi Submarine Base (1944–1945)
Eniwetok Submarine Base (1944–1945)
Coco Solo Submarine Base (1914-1960s) at Panama Canal Zone
USN Submarine Base, Ordnance Island, Bermuda (1942 to 1945)
Submarine Base Bangor (1942–2014) at Bangor, Washington
Exmouth Submarine Base, (1942–1943) advanced submarine base
Milne Bay Submarine Base in Papua New Guinea (1942–1945) advanced submarine base 
Merauke Submarine Base Dutch New Guinea, advanced submarine base
Thursday Island Submarine Base, Thursday Island in Torres Strait, Australia advanced submarine base
Holy Loch Submarine Base (1942–1945) in Scotland (1961 to 1992)
 Naval Support Activity La Maddalena, La Maddalena, Italy on Santo Stefano Island (1972–2008), advanced submarine base

Gallery

See also
 Shore facility
 Submarine pen
 Submarines in the United States Navy
 List of countries operating submarines
 List of submarine classes of the United States Navy
 Submarine Force Library and Museum
 Submarine squadron

References

United States Navy submarine bases
Naval Stations of the United States Navy
Closed installations of the United States Navy